Jean-Baptiste Illinois Jacquet (October 30, 1922 – July 22, 2004) was an American jazz tenor saxophonist, best remembered for his solo on "Flying Home", critically recognized as the first R&B saxophone solo.

Although he was a pioneer of the honking tenor saxophone that became a regular feature of jazz playing and a hallmark of early rock and roll, Jacquet was a skilled and melodic improviser, both on up-tempo tunes and ballads. He doubled on the bassoon, one of only a few jazz musicians to use the instrument.

Early life
Jacquet's parents were Creoles of color, named Marguerite Trahan and Gilbert Jacquet, When he was an infant, his family moved from Louisiana to Houston, Texas, and he was raised there as one of six siblings. His father was a part-time bandleader. As a child he performed in his father's band, primarily on the alto saxophone. His older brother Russell Jacquet played trumpet and his other brother Linton played drums.

At 15, Jacquet began playing with the Milton Larkin Orchestra, a Houston-area dance band. In 1939, he moved to Los Angeles, California, where he met Nat King Cole. Jacquet would sit in with the trio on occasion. In 1940, Cole introduced Jacquet to Lionel Hampton who had returned to California and was putting together a big band. Hampton wanted to hire Jacquet, but asked the young Jacquet to switch to tenor saxophone.

Career

In 1942, at age 19, Jacquet soloed on the Hampton Orchestra's recording of "Flying Home", one of the first times a honking tenor sax was heard on record. The record became a hit. The song immediately became the climax for the live shows and Jacquet became exhausted from having to "bring down the house" every night. The solo was built to weave in and out of the arrangement and continued to be played by every saxophone player who followed Jacquet in the band, including Arnett Cobb and Dexter Gordon, who achieved almost as much attention as Jacquet in playing it. It is one of the few jazz solos to have been memorized and played very much the same way by everyone who played the song. He left the Hampton band in 1943 and joined Cab Calloway's Orchestra. 

Jacquet appeared with Calloway's band in Lena Horne's movie Stormy Weather (1943). In the earlier years of Jacquet's career, his brother Linton Jacquet managed him on the chitlin circuit Linton's daughter, Brenda Jacquet-Ross, sang in jazz venues in the San Francisco Bay Area in the 1990s to early 2000s, with a band called the Mondo Players.

In 1944, Jacquet returned to California and started a small band with his brother Russell and a young Charles Mingus. It was at this time that he appeared in the Academy Award-nominated short film Jammin' the Blues with Lester Young. He also appeared at the first Jazz at the Philharmonic concert. In 1946, he moved to New York City, and joined the Count Basie orchestra, replacing Lester Young. 

In 1952, Jacquet co-wrote "Just When We're Falling in Love" (Jacquet (m), Sir Charles Thompson (m), S. K. "Bob" Russell (l)). Jacquet continued to perform (mostly in Europe) in small groups through the 1960s and 1970s. He led the Illinois Jacquet Big Band from 1981 until his death. 

Jacquet became the first jazz musician to be an artist-in-residence at Harvard University, in 1983. He played "C-Jam Blues" with President Bill Clinton on the White House lawn during Clinton's inaugural ball in 1993. Jacquet's final performance was on July 16, 2004, at the Lincoln Center in New York.

Personal life 
Jacquet was first married to Jacqueline Jacquet.

His marriage to socialite Barbara Jacquet ended in divorce. They had a daughter, Pamela Jacquet Davis.
Jacquet died in the home he shared with his long time partner, Carol Scherick, in Queens, New York, of a heart attack on July 22, 2004. He was 81 years old. He is interred in Woodlawn Cemetery, The Bronx, New York City.

Influence
His solos of the early and mid-1940s and his performances at the Jazz at the Philharmonic concert series, influenced rhythm and blues and rock and roll saxophone style, but also continue to be heard in jazz. His honking and screeching emphasized the lower and higher registers of the tenor saxophone. Despite a superficial rawness, the style is  heard in jazz players like Arnett Cobb, who also became known for playing "Flying Home" with Hampton, as well as Sonny Rollins, Eddie "Lockjaw" Davis and Jimmy Forrest.

Activism
Jacquet pushed back against Jim Crow laws in Houston. After booking his band to play at the Rice Hotel, he protested against management's rule that African Americans should enter the premises through an alley door. He issued an ultimatum: either allow his all-black orchestra to access the hotel through the main entrance or he would cancel the engagement. The Rice Hotel agreed to suspend the Jim Crow rule for Jacquet's band.

After leaving Houston to tour the United States and several other countries, Jacquet contemplated the manner in which he would return:

Jazz producer Norman Granz, who had been a social activist himself, made arrangements for the star-studded Philharmonic band to play an engagement at Houston's Music Hall on October 5, 1955. Jacquet played saxophone, accompanying Ella Fitzgerald, Dizzy Gillespie, Oscar Peterson, and Buddy Rich. Granz and Jacquet collaborated to eliminate Jim Crow customs from the event. There were no advanced sales of tickets, while Granz removed all of the "white" and "black" signs which indicated segregated facilities within the venue and hired some off-duty Houston police officers for security. The band played before a non-segregated audience, though not completely free of trouble. Despite Granz's precaution, five officers of the Houston Vice Squad stormed Ella Fitzgerald's dressing room with firearms drawn. Jacquet and Gillespie were playing dice games, which the Vice Squad used as a pretext for arresting Jacquet, Gillespie, Ella Fitzgerald and her assistant. This was a performance within a performance, however, as the quartet was whisked to the police station, where there were waiting photographers. After paying their fines, they all returned to the Music Hall where the band played the second set with the audience none the wiser.

Memorial

In 2008, The Chapel of the Sisters in Prospect Cemetery was restored and re-dedicated as the Illinois Jacquet Performance Space on the grounds of York College in Jamaica, Queens.

Discography

As leader 
 1951 Battle Of The Saxes (Aladdin LP-701 [10"]) – with Lester Young
 1951 Illinois Jacquet: Collates (Mercury/Clef MGC-112 [10"])
 1952 Illinois Jacquet: Collates, No. 2 (Mercury/Clef MGC-129 [10"])
 1953 Jazz By Jacquet (Clef MGC-167 [10"])
 1953 Jazz Moods By Illinois Jacquet (Clef MGC-622)
 1954 Illinois Jacquet And His Tenor Sax (Aladdin LP-708 [10"]; Aladdin LP-803 [rel. 1956]; Imperial LP-9184/LP-12184 [rel. 1962])
 1954 The Kid and the Brute (Clef MGC-680; Verve MGV-8065) – with Ben Webster
 1955 Illinois Jacquet [septet] (Clef MGC-676; Verve MGV-8061) – with Harry "Sweets" Edison
 1956 Jazz Moode (Clef MGC-700; Verve MGV-8084) compilation of MGC-112, MGC-129, MGC-622
 1956 Port Of Rico (Clef MGC-701; Verve MGV-8085) compilation of MGC-129, MGC-167, MGC-622
 1956 Groovin' with Jacquet (Clef MGC-702; Verve MGV-8086) compilation of MGC-112, MGC-129, MGC-167, MGC-622
 1956 Swing's the Thing (Clef MGC-750; Verve MGV-8023) -note: reissued on CD in 2005 by Lone Hill Jazz (LHJ-10228)
 1959 Illinois Jacquet Flies Again (Roulette SR-52035) -note: reissued on CD in 2005 by Lone Hill Jazz (LHJ-10229)
 1962 Illinois Jacquet And His Orchestra (Epic BA-17033) – with Roy Eldridge -note: reissued on CD in 2005 by Lone Hill Jazz (LHJ-10229)
 1963 The Message (Argo LPS-722) – with Kenny Burrell -note: reissued on CD in 2005 by Lone Hill Jazz (LHJ-10230)
 1964 Desert Winds (Argo LPS-735) – with Kenny Burrell -note: reissued on CD in 2005 by Lone Hill Jazz (LHJ-10230)
 1964 Bosses of the Ballad: Illinois Jacquet And Strings Play Cole Porter (Argo LPS-746) -note: reissued on CD in 2005 by Lone Hill Jazz (LHJ-10231)
 1965 Spectrum (Argo LPS-754) -note: reissued on CD in 2005 by Lone Hill Jazz (LHJ-10231)
 1966 Go Power! [recorded live at 'Lennie's On-The-Turnpike' in West Peabody, MA] (Cadet LPS-773) – with Milt Buckner, Alan Dawson -note: reissued on CD in 2005 by Lone Hill Jazz (LHJ-10232)
 1968 Bottoms Up: Illinois Jacquet On Prestige! (Prestige PR-7575) (CD reissue: Original Jazz Classics OJC-417)
 1968 The King! (Prestige PR-7597) (CD reissue: Original Jazz Classics OJC-849)
 1969 The Soul Explosion (Prestige PR-7629) (CD reissue: Original Jazz Classics OJC-674) 
 1969 The Blues; That's Me! (Prestige PR-7731) – with Tiny Grimes (CD reissue: Original Jazz Classics OJC-614)
 1971 Genius At Work! (Recorded Live At The Ronnie Scott Club, London) (Black Lion BL-146) -note: reissued on CD as The Comeback (Black Lion BLCD-760160)
 1973 Volume 1: Jazz At Town Hall (J.R.C. Records 11433) – with Arnett Cobb
 1973 The Blues From Louisiana (J.R.C. Records 11433; Classic Jazz CJ-???) -note: this is a reissue of Jazz At Town Hall
 1973 Illinois Jacquet With Wild Bill Davis (Disques Black And Blue 33.044; Classic Jazz CJ-112 [rel. 1978]) -note: reissued on CD as The Man I Love (Black & Blue BB-865) 
 1973 Illinois Jacquet With Wild Bill Davis, Vol. 2 (Disques Black And Blue 33.082)
 1974 Illinois Jacquet With Milt And Jo (Disques Black And Blue 33.070) – with Milt Buckner, Jo Jones -note: reissued on CD as Bottoms Up (Black & Blue BB-893)
 1975 Volume 2: Birthday Party (J.R.C. Records 11434) – with James Moody -note: reissued on CD in 1999 by Groove Note Records
 1976 Here Comes Freddy (Sonet SNTF-714) – with Howard McGhee (CD reissue: Sonet SNTCD-714) 
 1976 Jacquet's Street (Disques Black And Blue 33.112; Classic Jazz CJ-146 [rel. 1981]) (CD reissue: Black & Blue BB-972)
 1978 God Bless My Solo (Disques Black And Blue 33.167) (CD reissue: Black & Blue BB-941)
 1982 The Cool Rage [2LP compilation that also includes 4 previously unreleased tracks from 1958 with Wild Bill Davis and Kenny Burrell] (Verve VE2-2544) -note: the 4 tracks from the 1958 session are reissued on CD by Lone Hill Jazz (LHJ-10228) 
 1983 Jazz At The Philharmonic: Blues In Chicago 1955 (Verve 815155) – with Oscar Peterson, Herb Ellis 
 1988 Jacquet's Got It! (Atlantic 81816)
 1988 The Black Velvet Band [recorded 1947-1950] (Bluebird/RCA 6571-1-RB)
 1989 Banned In Boston (Portrait/CBS RJ-44391) -note: this is a reissue of Illinois Jacquet And His Orchestra (BA-17033)
 1991 Loot To Boot (LRC [Lester Radio Corporation] 9034) -note: this is a reissue of The Last Blues Album, Volume 1 (Groove Merchant GM-3303) with 3 tracks from Illinois Jacquet With Wild Bill Davis (Classic Jazz CJ-112) added on.
 1994 Flying Home: The Best Of The Verve Years (Verve 521644)
 1994 Jazz At The Philharmonic: The First Concert [recorded 1944] (Verve 521646) – with Nat "King" Cole, Les Paul, J. J. Johnson
 1994 Illinois Jacquet And His All Star New York Band [recorded 1980] (JSP 212)
 1996 The Complete Illinois Jacquet Sessions 1945-1950 [all his Philo/Aladdin, Apollo, ARA, Savoy, and RCA Victor material] (Mosaic MD4-0165) -4-CD box set
 2002 The Illinois Jacquet Story [recorded 1944-1951] (Proper BOX 49) -4-CD box set
 2002 Jumpin' At Apollo [recorded 1945-1947] (Delmark DE-538)
 2003 Live At Schaffhausen, Switzerland: March 18, 1978 (Storyville Records; UPC: 4526180360506)
 2006 Swingin' Live With Illinois Jacquet: His Final Performance [recorded 2004] (Jacquet Records; UPC: 837101208147) -2CD
 2013 Toronto 1947 (Uptown Records; UPC: 026198277321) – with Leo Parker
 2014 Live In Berlin 1987 (Squatty Roo Records; UPC: 686647021204)
 2014 Live In Burghausen 1996 (Squatty Roo Records; UPC: 686647022102)

As sideman
With Count Basie
String Along with Basie (Roulette, 1960)
Half a Sixpence (Dot, 1967)
With Kenny Burrell
Bluesin' Around (Columbia, 1962 [released 1983])
With Joey DeFrancesco
Where Were You? (Columbia, 1990)
With Modern Jazz Quartet
MJQ & Friends: A 40th Anniversary Celebration (Atlantic, 1994)
With Buddy Rich
The Last Blues Album Volume 1 (Groove Merchant, 1974)
With Sonny Stitt
What's New!!! (Roulette, 1966)
With Buddy Tate
Buddy Tate and His Buddies (Chiaroscuro, 1973)

References

Further reading

Morrison, Nick (2011) "Five Titans Of Texas Tenor Sax". NPR.Org.
NPR Radio (2008) "Illinois Jacquet: King Of The Screeching Tenor". NPR Radio. November 5, 2008.
Scherick, Carol (2011) "Biography by Illinois Jacquet for Press".
USA TODAY (2004) "Jazz saxophonist Illinois Jacquet dies"

External links 
The Illinois Jacquet Foundation
The Chapel of Sisters / Illinois Jacquet Performance Space
Illinois Jacquet Interview NAMM Oral History Library (1995)

1922 births
2004 deaths
People from Broussard, Louisiana
African-American saxophonists
American jazz bassoonists
American male jazz musicians
American jazz tenor saxophonists
American male saxophonists
American people who self-identify as being of Native American descent
Argo Records artists
Bebop saxophonists
Cadet Records artists
Count Basie Orchestra members
Harvard University staff
Jump blues saxophonists
Louisiana Creole people
Musicians from Houston
Prestige Records artists
Swing saxophonists
Verve Records artists
RCA Records artists
Atlantic Records artists
Savoy Records artists
Epic Records artists
American rock saxophonists
Apollo Records artists
African-American rock musicians
Burials at Woodlawn Cemetery (Bronx, New York)
Mercury Records artists
Roulette Records artists
20th-century saxophonists
Jazz musicians from Louisiana
Black Lion Records artists
Black & Blue Records artists
Aladdin Records artists
The Cab Calloway Orchestra members
20th-century American male musicians